Okladnikov may refer to:

 Alexey Pavlovich Okladnikov, a Soviet archaeologist, historian, and ethnographer
 Okladnikov Cave, a paleoanthropological site in Siberia containing the fossil remains of Neanderthals